The Saint Helena Supreme Court was established in 1839 and has jurisdiction over the entire territory (i. e., Saint Helena, Ascension Island and Tristan da Cunha).

Article 82(3) of the Constitution of Saint Helena, Ascension and Tristan da Cunha provides that "the Supreme Court shall possess and may exercise all the jurisdiction which is vested in, or is capable of being exercised by, His Majesty's High Court of Justice in England."

It is one of four judicial courts that exist in Saint Helena, the other three being the Court of Appeal, the Magistrates Court and the Juvenile Court. Saint Helena is an overseas territory of the United Kingdom and follows English law in place prior to 2006, as well as legislation from the local legislature.

The Chief Justice and other judges are appointed by letters patent on the recommendation of the Governor.

Chief justices:
1869–1870 Joseph Stone Williams 
c.1874–1875 William Alexander Parker  (afterwards Chief Justice of British Honduras, 1875)
c.1924 Wilberforce John James Arnold (acting)
1959 Lionel Brett
1983–1992 Sir John Farley Spry
1992–2006 Geoffrey William Martin 
2007– Charles Wareing Ekins

See also
 St Helena Magistrates' Court
 Saint Helena Police Service
 Sheriff of Saint Helena
 Attorney General of Saint Helena

References

External links
 Criminal courts on the official government website
 Part VI of the Constitution of St Helena

Supreme Court
Supreme Court
Saint Helena, Ascension and Tristan da Cunha law
British Overseas Territories courts
1839 establishments in the British Empire
1839 establishments in Africa